Hopper Field is a stadium located in Freeport, Texas on the campus of Brazosport High School at the east banks of the Brazos River.  It is currently home to the high school football teams of the Brazosport Independent School District (BISD), and seats 10,478.  It was named in honor of Brazosport High School coach Herbert Eugene Hopper who had served in that position since 1927. Hopper later became the athletic director of the school, and continued in that role before finally retiring in 1971. The stadium is also the site for BISD commencement ceremonies.

History
Hopper Field opened on September 16, 1949 with a game between Brazosport High School and St. Thomas High School of Houston.  During the first season of use, stadium lights were blown down due to high winds caused by the 1949 Texas hurricane, and night games were no longer possible until their repair.  Originally seating 6,400, Hopper Field's capacity was expanded to 8,662 in 1961.  In 2004, an artificial turf known as "Momentum Turf" by Sportexe was installed, among other renovations.

References

High school football venues in Texas
Sports venues in Texas
Buildings and structures in Brazoria County, Texas
Brazosport Independent School District
1949 establishments in Texas
Sports venues completed in 1949